Guy Kerr (born 3 April 1988) is a Scottish former professional footballer who played for Inverness Caledonian Thistle, Elgin City, East Fife and Berwick Rangers. Through most of his career he played as a striker, but moved to play as a defender later in his career.

Career 
Kerr made his professional debut on 3 May 2008 in a 6–1 win over Gretna, coming on as a substitute in the 86th minute for Ian Black. Guy scored his first goal on 27 September 2008 in a 5–2 loss to East Stirlingshire while on loan at Elgin City.

Career statistics

References

Living people
1988 births
Scottish footballers
Association football forwards
Association football defenders
Scottish Premier League players
Scottish Football League players
Inverness Caledonian Thistle F.C. players
Elgin City F.C. players
East Fife F.C. players
Berwick Rangers F.C. players